Alex Kresovich (also known as AK) (born August 28, 1986, in Harlingen, Texas, United States) is an American, RIAA-Platinum certified and Billboard #1 record producer and songwriter from Ithaca, New York.  He is best known for his work with Panic! at the Disco, Cee Lo Green, Niykee Heaton, MAX, Hoodie Allen, Snow Tha Product, Chris Webby, and Jocelyn Alice.

Kresovich earned a Doctor of Philosophy (PhD) degree at the University of North Carolina at Chapel Hill where he studied the influence of popular music which references anxiety, depression, and suicidal thoughts on the mental health attitudes and behaviors of U.S. youth. His research is published in JAMA Pediatrics, the Journal of Health Communication, and Health Communication. His research has received media coverage in The New York Times and U.S. News & World Report.

In addition to his music and academic work, Kresovich serves as Partner and Chief Strategy Officer for The Cut Buddy, an Ithaca-originated and North Carolina-based personal grooming company invented and founded by Joshua Esnard that appeared on the ABC television show Shark Tank in November 2017.

Music career 
Kresovich has collaborated with Panic! at the Disco, Cee Lo Green, X Ambassadors, Kanye West's G.O.O.D. Music, Kid Ink, Niykee Heaton, Ingrid Andress, Jared Leto (30 Seconds to Mars), G-Eazy, King Los, Bipolar Sunshine, Emily Warren (Dua Lipa, Shawn Mendes, The Chainsmokers), Jesse Saint John (Lizzo, Britney Spears, Charli XCX), Sonny Digital (Future, Drake, 2 Chainz), Vincent Berry II (Beyonce, J. Cole), Michael Pollack (Maroon 5, Justin Bieber, Demi Lovato), Daniel Wilson (The Weeknd, Kendrick Lamar), Ryan Tedder (Adele, Ariana Grande, Taylor Swift), Ester Dean (Rihanna, Katy Perry, Nicki Minaj), and Shane McAnally (Kacey Musgraves, Keith Urban, Miranda Lambert).

In 2011, Kresovich won the 2K Sports/Duck Down Music NBA 2K12 Soundtrack Contest.

In 2020, Kresovich produced and co-wrote "How Could You Not Know" by Jocelyn Alice which appeared on Season 2, Episode 3 of the NBC television show, Songland. The song was re-produced for H.E.R. by Grammy-winning music producer and songwriter Shane McAnally, who tweeted of Kresovich and Alice's original version, "I hope people realize how intricate and impressive this song is melodically and lyrically. Cause damn, I am blown away." The final version of "How Could You Not Know?" co-written/produced with Shane McAnally, Ryan Tedder, and Ester Dean was released to streaming platforms on November 5, 2021 and the official music video on November 12, 2021.

Education 
Kresovich attended Cornell University, where he earned a Bachelor of Science (B.S.) degree in communication.  He earned a Master of Arts (M.A.) degree from the University of Georgia. Kresovich earned a Doctor of Philosophy (PhD) degree at the University of North Carolina at Chapel Hill.

Selected academic publications 
Kresovich, A., Reffner Collins, M. K., Riffe, D., & Carpentier, F. R. D. (2021). A Content Analysis of Mental Health Discourse in Popular Rap Music. JAMA Pediatrics, 75(3), 286-292. A Content Analysis of Mental Health Discourse in Popular Rap Music

Kresovich, A. (2020). The Influence of Pop Songs Referencing Anxiety, Depression, and Suicidal Ideation on College Students’ Mental Health Empathy, Stigma, and Behavioral Intentions. Health Communication.

Kresovich, A., & Noar, S. M. (2020). The Power of Celebrity Health Events: Meta-analysis of the Relationship between Audience Involvement and Behavioral Intentions. Journal of Health Communication.

Selected production discography

Panic! at the Disco - Pray for the Wicked
 "King of the Clouds" (Single)

Cee Lo Green - Heart Blanche
 "Thorns"

Hoodie Allen - People Keep Talking
 "Against Me" (featuring MAX)

Niykee Heaton - Promotional Singles
 "Cold War" (Promotional Single)
 "Kill 'Em All" (Promotional Single)
 "Remember It All"

Chris Webby - Chemically Imbalanced
 "Nice 2 Be Back"
 "Blue Skies" (featuring Anna Yvette) (Promotional Single)

Jocelyn Alice - Songland Season 2
 "How Could You Not Know?" (Original Version)
 "How Could You Not Know?" (Final Version co-written/produced with Shane McAnally, Ryan Tedder, and Ester Dean)

Snow Tha Product - The Rest Comes Later
 "Bad Bitches" (Single)

NBA 2K12 - NBA 2K12 Official Soundtrack
 Alex K., D.J.I.G. - Now's My Time (2K Original)

References 

1986 births
Living people
People from Harlingen, Texas
People from Ithaca, New York
Musicians from Ithaca, New York
Record producers from New York (state)
Record producers from Texas
Cornell University alumni
University of Georgia alumni
Ithaca High School (Ithaca, New York) alumni